Brachygalba is a genus of bird in the Galbulidae family.

It contains the following species:

 
Bird genera
Taxa named by Charles Lucien Bonaparte
Taxonomy articles created by Polbot